Calliste can refer to the following entries:

 Calliste (mythology), a character in Greek mythology
 Jason Calliste (born 1990), Canadian basketball player 
 Jerry Calliste Jr. (born 1965), American entrepreneur, music industry executive producer, songwriter, record producer, music publisher, and former DJ